The Ford Model A (also colloquially called the A-Model Ford or the A, and A-bone among hot rodders and customizers) was the Ford Motor Company's second market success, replacing the venerable Model T which had been produced for 18 years. It was first produced on October 20, 1927, but not introduced until December 2. This new Model A (a previous model had used the name in 1903–04) was designated a 1928 model and was available in four standard colors. 

By February 4, 1929, one million Model As had been sold, and by July 24, two million. The range of body styles ran from the Tudor at US$500 (in grey, green, or black) ($ in  dollars ) to the town car with a dual cowl at US$1,200 ($ in  dollars ). In March 1930, Model A sales hit three million, and there were nine body styles available.

Model A production ended in March 1932, after 4,858,644 had been made in all body styles. Its successor was the Model B, which featured an updated inline four-cylinder engine, as well as the Model 18, which introduced Ford's new flathead (sidevalve) V8 engine.

Features
Prices for the Model A ranged from US$385 for a roadster to US$1,400 for the top-of-the-line town car. This engine provided . The Model A had a  wheelbase with a final drive ratio of 3.77:1. The transmission was a conventional unsynchronized three-speed sliding-gear manual with a single speed reverse. The Model A had four-wheel mechanical drum brakes. The 1930 and 1931 models were available with stainless steel radiator cowlings and headlamp housings.

The Model A came in a wide variety of styles including coupes (standard and deluxe), business coupe, sport coupe, roadster coupes (standard and deluxe), convertible cabriolet, convertible sedan, phaetons (standard and deluxe), Tudor sedans (standard and deluxe), town car, Fordors (five-window standard, three-window deluxe), Victoria, town sedan, station wagon, taxicab, truck, and commercial. The very rare special coupe started production around March 1928 and ended mid-1929. 

The Model A was the first Ford to use the standard set of driver controls with conventional clutch and brake pedals, throttle, and gearshift. Previous Fords used controls that had become uncommon to drivers of other makes. The Model A's fuel tank was situated in the cowl, between the engine compartment's fire wall and the dash panel. It had a visual fuel gauge, and the fuel flowed to the carburetor by gravity. A rear-view mirror was optional. In cooler climates, owners could purchase an aftermarket cast iron unit to place over the exhaust manifold to provide heat to the cab. A small door provided adjustment of the amount of hot air entering the cab. The Model A was the first car to have safety glass in the windshield.

The Soviet company GAZ, which started as a joint venture between Ford and the Soviet Union, made a licensed version from 1932–1936. This served as the basis for the FAI and BA-20 armored cars which saw use as Soviet scout vehicles in the early stages of World War II.

In addition to the United States, Ford made the Model A in plants in Argentina, Canada, Denmark, France, Germany, Italy, Japan and the United Kingdom.

It therefore was expensive to own and too heavy and uneconomical to achieve volume sales, and so unable to compete in the newly developing mass market, while also too crude to compete as a luxury product. European manufactured Model As failed to achieve the sales success in Europe that would greet their smaller successor in Britain and Germany.

Development history
From the mid 1910s through the early 1920s, Ford dominated the automotive market with its Model T. However, during the mid-1920s, this dominance eroded as competitors, especially the various General Motors divisions, caught up with Ford's mass production system and began to better Ford in some areas, especially by offering more powerful engines, new convenience features, or cosmetic customization. Also, features Henry Ford considered to be unnecessary, such as electric starters, were gradually shifting in the public's perception from luxuries to essentials.

Ford's sales force recognized the threat and advised Henry to respond to it. Initially he resisted, but the T's sagging market share finally forced him to admit a replacement was needed. When he finally agreed to begin development of this new model, he focused on the mechanical aspects and on what today is called design for manufacturability (DFM), which he had always strongly embraced and for which the Model T production system was famous. Although ultimately successful, the development of the Model A included many problems that had to be resolved. For example, the die stamping of parts from sheet steel, which the Ford company had led to new heights of development with the Model T production system, was something Henry had always been ambivalent about; it had brought success, but he felt that it was not the best choice for durability. He was determined that the Model A would rely more on drop forgings than the Model T, but his ideas to improve the DFM of forging did not prove practical. Eventually, Ford's engineers persuaded him to relent, lest the Model A's production cost force up its retail price too much.

Henry's disdain for cosmetic vanity as applied to automobiles led him to leave the Model A's styling to a team led by his son Edsel, even though he would take credit for it despite his son doing more of the work.

It was during the period from the mid-1920s to early 1930s that the limits of the first generation of mass production, epitomized by the Model T production system's rigidity, became apparent. The era of "flexible mass production" had begun.

Legacy
The Model A was well represented in media of the era, since it was one of the most common cars. Model kits remain available from hobby shops as stock cars or hot rods.  High quality die-cast Model As are represented in 1/24 scale by the Danbury Mint 1931 roadster and the Franklin Mint 1930 Tudor sedan.

Several Model As have obtained particular fame. The Mean Green Machine, a green and black 1931 Tudor sedan, has been a staple of University of North Texas football games and special events since 1974, maintained by the spirit organization Talons since the 1980s. The Ramblin' Wreck, a 1930 sport coupe, is the official mascot of the student body at the Georgia Institute of Technology and appears at sporting events and student body functions. Ala Kart, a customized 1929 roadster pickup built by George Barris, won two straight "America's Most Beautiful Roadster" awards at the Oakland Roadster Show before making numerous film and television appearances. Between October 1992 and December 1994, Hector Quevedo, along with his son Hugo, drove a 1928 Model A  from his home in Punta Arenas, Chile to Ford headquarters in Dearborn, Michigan. The car required minimal service, including a flat tire and transmission work in Nicaragua, and is now housed in the Henry Ford Museum. A 1930 Model A, used by the gangster John Dillinger to escape federal agents in 1934, was sold at auction in 2010 for $165,000.

Charlie Ryan's song "Hot Rod Lincoln" featured a modified Model A. The song has been covered several times since its original release.

Jenny Railcars

The West Side Lumber Company of California converted several Model As into railcars which could carry 12 people. A few still see regular service on the Yosemite Mountain Sugar Pine Railroad, also in California, alongside Shays Nos. 10 and 15.

Gallery

References

Bibliography
 
 
 
 Gauld, Graham. "The Ford Motor Company", in Northey, Tom, ed. World of Automobile, Volume 6, pp. 681–700. London: Phoebus, 1974.

Further reading

External links

 Model A Ford Reference Sheet, Owners Manual, and Help
 Model A Ford Club of America - 
 Model A Restorers Club - 
 Ford Model AA Truck Club - 
 A-Ford Club Nederland - 
 
 Follow Henry As We Tour The Long Beach Assembly Plant circa 1930
 Ford Model A Assembly Plant in Edgewater NJ
 Fordbarn, An active forum for discussion about the Model A Ford
 365 Days of A, One man's quest to drive a Ford Model A for an entire year.
 1930 Model A sales brochure

Model A
Cars introduced in 1927
1900s cars
Coupés
Full-size vehicles
Pickup trucks
Rear-wheel-drive vehicles
Town cars
Sedans
Rail and road vehicle